Namthang is a small town in Namchi district of the Indian state of Sikkim. It is located 24 km distance from Namchi City, the district headquarter of Namchi district. It is located 61 km away from the capital city of the state of Sikkim, Gangtok.
The nearest city Namchi, Rangpo is 21 km away from Namthang towards East.  180°  Wide mountain ranges can be viewed from the Town. Namthang is one of the famous tourist destinations in South Sikkim. Nagi hill, Tendong hill and Perbing Valley (organic farming) Namthang Bamboo Handicrafts (palitam)are the main tourist point in the area. Tourism, dairy farming, poultry farming and cash crop are the main source of income. Geographical features and road connectivity are the plus points for the people of Namthang.

Bank available is State Bank of India, Namthang, State Bank of Sikkim, Namthang. ATM available- SBI and HDFC Bank.

 IFSC CODE : SBIN0009727.
 MCR CODE : 737002522.

References

Cities and towns in Namchi district